The New Jersey PGA Championship is a golf tournament that is the section championship of the New Jersey section of the PGA of America. It has been played annually since 1928 at a variety of courses around the state. The format from 1932 to 1934 and 1954 to 1957 was match play.  Since 1958, the format has been stroke play.  It was considered a PGA Tour event in the 1920s and 1930s.

Winners

2022 Nick Bova
2021 Tyler Hall
2020 Danny Lewis
2019 Brett Jones
2018 Brent Studer
2017 Alex Beach
2016 Alex Beach
2015 Brent Studer
2014 Pat Fillian
2013 Frank Esposito, Jr.
2012 Brian Gaffney
2011 Sam Kang
2010 Frank Esposito, Jr.
2009 Frank Esposito, Jr.
2008 Brent Studer
2007 Frank Esposito, Jr.
2006 Bill Britton
2005 Bill Britton
2004 Joey Rassett
2003 Frank Esposito, Jr.
2002 Steve Sieg
2001 Mike Burke Jr.
2000 Chris Dachisen
1999 Mike Burke Jr.
1998 Brent Studer
1997 John Klocksin
1996 Robin Kohberger
1995 Gary Ostrega
1994 Jamie Fordyce
1993 Bill King
1992 Mike Burke Jr.
1991 Steve Sieg
1990 Ed Whitman
1989 Peter Oosterhuis
1988 Bill King
1987 Ed Whitman
1986 David Glenz
1985 David Glenz
1984 Gary Ostrega
1983 Ed Whitman
1982 Ed Whitman
1981 Pat Schwab
1980 Carlton White
1979 Tom Ulozas
1978 Babe Lichardus
1977 Babe Lichardus
1976 Bill Ziobro
1975 Gary Head
1974 Charles Huckaby
1973 John Buczek
1972 Dick Pearce
1971 Pat Schwab
1970 Pat Schwab
1969 Bob Shields
1968 Pat Schwab
1967 Stan Mosel
1966 Babe Lichardus
1965 Babe Lichardus
1964 Wes Ellis
1963 Wes Ellis
1962 Wes Ellis
1961 Wes Ellis
1960 Al Mengert
1959 Harold Sanderson
1958 Jake Zastko
1957 Emery Thomas
1956 Stan Mosel
1955 Otto Greiner
1954 Fred Backer
1953 Babe Lichardus
1952 Lou Barbaro
1951 Emery Thomas
1950 Emery Thomas
1949 Vic Ghezzi
1948 Angelo Petraglia
1947 Gene Kunes
1946 Jack Mitchell
1945 Emery Thomas
1944 Dave O'Connell
1943 Emery Thomas
1942 Johnny Kinder
1941 Frank Walsh
1940 Frank Walsh
1939 Vic Ghezzi
1938 Craig Wood
1937 Johnny Kinder
1936 Vic Ghezzi
1935 Maurrie O'Connor
1934 Johnny Kinder
1933 Johnny Kinder
1932 Craig Wood
1931 Clarence Clark
1930 Craig Wood
1929 Jack Forrester
1928 Craig Wood

References

External links
PGA of America – New Jersey section
List of winners

Former PGA Tour events
Golf in New Jersey
PGA of America sectional tournaments
Recurring sporting events established in 1928
1928 establishments in New Jersey